Francis Lorenz Bevan, MA (30 October 1872 – 11 March 1947 ) was an Anglican priest in Sri Lanka during the first half of the Twentieth century: he was the Archdeacon of Jaffna from 1925 until 1935; and after that Archdeacon of Colombo from then until his death.

He was educated at Royal College, Colombo and Christ's College, Cambridge; was ordained in 1896. After a curacy at St Paul, Kandy he was the incumbent at Christ Church, Kurunegala then St Paul, Pettah before his years as an Archdeacon.

References

Sri Lankan Anglican priests
Sri Lankan educational theorists
Anglican chaplains
Alumni of Royal College, Colombo
Alumni of Christ's College, Cambridge
1872 births
1947 deaths
Archdeacons of Colombo
Archdeacons of Jaffna
People associated with S. Thomas' College, Mount Lavinia